Rivne Oblast, also referred to as Rivnenshchyna, is an oblast (province) in western Ukraine. Its administrative center is Rivne. Its population is:  

Before its annexation by the Soviet Union during World War II, the region was part of the Second Polish Republic's Wołyń Voivodeship following the Polish–Soviet War. Previously it was part of the Volhynian Governorate.

The Rivne Nuclear Power Plant is located in the oblast, near the city of Varash.

Geography

The region is located almost in the middle of the historical region of Volhynia which is indicated on its coat of arms with a white cross on a red background. Volhynia was completely partitioned after the Soviet occupation of Poland in September 1939 and divided between three oblasts, Volyn, Rivne, and Ternopil, with some additional eastern portions in Zhytomyr Oblast.

The relief of the region varies, its northern portion lies in the Polesian Lowland, while its southern is located within Volhynian Upland. The highest hills known as Povcha Upland reach over 350 meters. The main water artery of the region is river Horyn, while northwestern area also reaches Prypiat. Big portions of the oblast covered in woodlands. It also has a great deal of such excavated minerals like amber and basalt. In recent years (2016–2017) there were reports of illegal extraction of so called Rovno amber in the area.

Subdivisions

On 19 July 2020, the number of districts was reduced to four. These are:

 Dubno (Дубенський район), the center is in the town of Dubno;
 Rivne (Рівненський район), the center is in the city of Rivne;
 Sarny (Сарненський район), the center is in the town of Sarny;
 Varash (Вараський район), the center is in the town of Varash.

Until 19 july 2020 the Rivne Oblast is administratively subdivided into 16 raions (districts) as well as 4 cities (municipalities) which are directly subordinate to the oblast government: Dubno, Varash, Ostroh, and the administrative center of the oblast, Rivne.

Demographics

Rivne is one of the regions with the highest birth rate in all of Ukraine. The heavy rural (about two thirds of the population is rural) and ethnic Ukrainian (close to 95%) composition of the population might be responsible for this. However the birth rate is not uniform across Rivne, with raions like Ostroh having extremely low birth rates (9.7 per 1000) and other raions like Rokytne Raion having extremely high birth rates (24.0 per 1000).

Vital statistics by raion (2008)

According to statistics the population of Rivne Oblast Central Office at 1 January 2013 is 1,156,900 people.

In 2012, it increased by 2612 people. This was due to natural increase 4014 people at the same time reduce the migration of the population -1,402 people.

Compared to 2011, the volume of natural growth increased by 485 people. Natural movement of the population in 2012 was characterized by an increase in fertility and mortality, compared to 2011. In 2012, the number of births in the region was 619 more than in 2011.

Fertility in rural areas is higher than in urban areas (18 per cent against 13.5 per cent). total fertility rate for 2012 was 15.9 (Either the highest Ukraine).

Compared to 2011, the mortality rate in 2012 rose from 12.3 to 12.4 deaths per 1,000 inhabitants. The mortality rate in rural areas is 1.6 pa za higher than in urban areas.

Age structure
 0-14 years: 19.7%  (male 116,507/female 110,834)
 15-64 years: 68.2%  (male 385,381/female 402,566)
 65 years and over: 12.1%  (male 45,796/female 94,724) (2013 official)

Median age
 total: 35.2 years 
 male: 32.8 years 
 female: 37.5 years  (2013 official)

Points of interest
The some listed historic-cultural sites were nominated for the Seven Wonders of Ukraine.
 Ostroh Castle
 Troitsk monastery (Korec)
 Dubno Castle
 Spring of St. Anna
 Tarakaniv Fort
 Novomalyna Castle
 Rivne Nuclear Power Plant
 Battle of Berestechko Field
 Narrow-gauge railway (Tunnel of Love (railway))

Nomenclature

Most of Ukraine's oblasts are named after their capital cities, officially referred to as "oblast centers" (translit. oblasnyi tsentr). The name of each oblast is a relative adjective, formed by adding a feminine suffix to the name of respective center city: Rivne is the center of  the Rivnens’ka oblast’ (Rivne Oblast). Most oblasts are also sometimes referred to in a feminine noun form, following the convention of traditional regional place names, ending with the suffix "-shchyna", as is the case with the Rivne Oblast, Rivnenshchyna.

Before 1992, under the policy of Russification, the region was officially known under its Russian name of Rovno Oblast.

See also

 List of villages in Rivne Oblast
 Subdivisions of Ukraine

External links
 - Web-site of Rivne

References

 
Oblasts of Ukraine
States and territories established in 1939
1939 establishments in Ukraine